The Compagnie des chemins de fer Bône-Guelma (Bône-Guelma Railway Company) built and operated railway lines in Algeria and Tunisia between 1875 and 1923 during the French colonial period. In 1923 it became the Compagnie fermière des chemins de fer tunisiens.

History 

The Bone-Guelma Railway Company was founded in 1875.
The concession for construction of the line from Bone to Guelma, between the French government and the Société de Construction des Batignolles, was ceded by the latter in 1876 to the Bône-Guelma Railway Company, which had been founded by Ernest Goüin, with the assistance of the Banque de Paris et des Pays-Bas, of which Goüin was a director.
The Bone-Guelma company contracted with Batignolles to build the line. 
The line had a station at Taya, eight kilometers by mule track from the Djebel Taya antimony mine .

The Algerian network was purchased by the State on 6 June 1914 and operated from 1 April 1915 by Algerian State Railways.

In 1922, the Tunisian government bought the Tunisian part of the network and entrusted operations to the Compagnie fermière des chemins de fer tunisiens by an agreement of 22 June 1922.

On June 8, 1923, a general meeting of shareholders took note of the change in the company's activities by changing its name to the Compagnie fermière des chemins de fer tunisiens.

Lines

Algeria
 Bône – Duvivier  opened in 1876
 Duvivier – Guelma – Kroubs  opened from 1877 to 1879
 Duvivier – Souk Ahras – Ghardimaou  opened from 1881 to 1884
 Souk Ahras – Tébessa  opened in 1888 (metre gauge)

The company also operated the  tramway from Saint-Paul to Randon.

Tunisia

In Tunisia the company operated two networks. The northern network was built at the normal gauge and the southern network used the metre-gauge. 
The networks included the following lines:

Normal track (Northern network) 

 Tunis – Djedeida – Tebourba , opened in 1878
 Tebourba – Majaz al Bab , opened in 1878 
 Majaz al Bab – Oued Zarga , opened in 1878
 Oued Zarga – Béja – Pont-de-Trajan , opened in 1879
 Pont-de-Trajan – Sidi-Ali-Jébini , opened in 1879
 Sidi-Ali-Jébini – Jendouba , opened in 1879
 Tunis-Nord – Le Bardo , opened in 1873 and surrendered in 1879 by the Tunisian Railway Company 
 Jendouba – Ghardimaou , opened in 1880
 Tunis-Marine – Hammam-Lif , opened in 1882 (converted to metre gauge in 1897)
 Mastouta – Béja , opened in 1885
 Djedeida – Mateur – Tinja – Bizerte , branch in 1894
 Tinja – Ferryville , branch opened in 1894
 Tunis-Jonction {{convert|Bab Alioua) – La Goulette-Port , opened in 1909 (Three lines of rails 1000/1435 mm)
 Mateur – Tamera
 Mateur – Jefna , opened in 1909
 Jefna – Tamera , opened on 1 September 1912
 Mateur-Sud – Sidi M'himech – Béja , opened on 1 September 1912
 Sidi Smaïl – La Merja – Khereddine , opened on 1 June 1914
 Khereddine – Nebeur , opened in 1915
 Tamera – Nefza , opened on 1 January 1917

Metre gauge (South)
 Tunis-Marine – Hammam-Lif , opened in 1882 (converted to metre gauge in 1897)
 Hammam-Lif – Fondouk Jedid – Grombalia , opened in 1895
 Grombalia – Bir Bouregba – Nabeul-Voyageurs , opened in 1895
 Fondouk Jedid – Menzel Bouzelfa , branch opened in 1895
 Bir Bouregba – Enfidha , opened in 1896
 Enfidha – Kalâa Seghira , opened in 1896
 Kalâa Seghira – Sousse , opened in 1896
 Tunis-Ville – Sminja – Zaghouan , opened in 1897
 Sminja – Pont-du-Fahs , opened in 1897
 Djebel Jelloud – Hammam-Lif , opened in 1897 (converted to metre gauge)
 Sousse – Sousse-Port , opened in 1897
 Bir El Kassaâ – Radès (south port of La Goulette) , opened in 1897
 Bir El Kassaâ – La Laverie , opened in 1899
 Sousse – Ouerdanin – Moknine , opened in 1899
 Pont-du-Fahs – Bou Arada , opened in 1902
 Bou Arada – Gaâfour , opened in 1904
 Gaâfour – Les Salines , opened in 1904
 Les Salines – Le Kef , embranchement opened in 1904
 Les Salines – Fej Tameur – Kalaat es Senam , opened in 1905
 Fej Tameur – Slata , branch opened in 1908
 Aïn Ghrasésia – Jilma , opened in 1908
 Jilma – Sbeitla , opened on 15 June1908
 Sbeitla – Kasserine – Henchir Souatir , opened on 1 December 1909
 Ouerdanin – Sfax , opened in 1911
 Menzel Bouzelfa – Henchir Lebna , opened in 1918
 Henchir Lebna – Oum Douil , opened in 1925
 Henchir Lebna – Menzel Temime , opened in 1927
 Rhilane Station (Algeria) – Aïn Kerma (Tunisia) , opened on 1 May 1931

Junction stations 

 Sfax Station with the network of the Compagnie des phosphates et des chemins de fer de Gafsa 
 Henchir Souatir Station with the network of the Compagnie des phosphates et des chemins de fer de Gafsa

Rolling stock

 Normal track
 No.1 to 39, type 030t, delivered between 1876 and 1882 by the Société de construction des Batignolles
 No.81 to 86, type 130t, delivered in 1899 by Baldwin Locomotive Works
 No.136 to 155, type 030t, delivered between 1880 and 1883 by the Société de construction des Batignolles
 No.181 to 185, type 231, delivered in 1914 by the Société Alsacienne de Constructions Mécaniques (SACM)
 No.186 to 188, type 231, delivered in 1924 by the SACM
 No.189 to 192, type 231, delivered in 1930 by the SACM
 No.221 to 235, type 150, delivered in 1910 by the SACM
 No.501 to 505, type 230, delivered in 1904 by the Société de construction des Batignolles
 No.11 and 12, type 130t, delivered in 1904 by the Société de construction des Batignolles
 metre track
 No.1 to 2, type 030t, delivered in 1888 by the Société de construction des Batignolles
 No.3 to 9, type 030t, delivered in 1894 by the Société de construction des Batignolles
 No.201 to 204, type 030t, delivered in 1886 by the Société de construction des Batignolles
 No.211 and 212, type 030t, delivered in 1886 by the Société de construction des Batignolles
 No.281 to 284, type 130t, delivered in 1899 by Baldwin Locomotive Works
 No.401 to 415, type 130t, delivered between 1897 and 1907 by the Société de construction des Batignolles
 No.681 to 690, type Mallet 030-030t, Baldwin Locomotive Works, delivered in 1920
 No.701 to 712, type 230, delivered between 1905 and 1907 by the Société de construction des Batignolles
 No.801 to 805, type 231, delivered in 1913 by the SACM

Notes

Sources

Rail transport in Algeria
Rail transport in Tunisia
1875 establishments
1923 disestablishments